Vurnik is a Slovenian surname. Notable people with this surname include:

 Helena Kottler Vurnik (1882–1962), Slovenian artist
 Ivan Vurnik (1884–1971), Slovenian architect

Slovene-language surnames